Vidbol Glacier is the 5.5 km long and 1.5 km wide glacier on Arctowski Peninsula on Danco Coast in Graham Land on the Antarctic Peninsula draining the north slopes of Pulfrich Peak.  Flowing northwestwards west of Henryk Peak and east of Mount Dedo to enter Gerlache Strait at Orne Harbour.

The glacier is named after Vidbol River in northwestern Bulgaria.

Location
British mapping in 1980.

Maps
 British Antarctic Territory. Scale 1:200000 topographic map No. 3217. DOS 610 - W 64 62. Tolworth, UK, 1980.
 Antarctic Digital Database (ADD). Scale 1:250000 topographic map of Antarctica. Scientific Committee on Antarctic Research (SCAR). Since 1993, regularly upgraded and updated.

References
 Vidbol Glacier. SCAR Composite Gazetteer of Antarctica.
 Bulgarian Antarctic Gazetteer. Antarctic Place-names Commission. (details in Bulgarian, basic data in English)

External links
 Vidbol Glacier. Copernix satellite image

Glaciers of Danco Coast
Bulgaria and the Antarctic